Stern Spotlight is a "best of" compilation of The Howard Stern Show. Each episode showcases a specific cast member past or present of the Stern Show. Every member gets two parts and plays Wednesday and Thursday on Howard 100 and Howard 101 on Sirius Satellite Radio. The special airs during select weeks when The Howard Stern Show is on vacation during its timeslot. The show is a production of "The Tapes Team" at SIRIUS, along with Master Tape Theatre, Mammary Lane, and The History of Howard Stern.

Episodes
 Billy West, part 1 (February 19, 2007)
 Billy West, part 2 (February 20, 2007)
 Jackie Martling, part 1 (May 29, 2007)
 Jackie Martling, part 2 (May 30, 2007)
 Stuttering John, part 1 (April 14, 2008)
 Stuttering John, part 2 (April 15, 2008)

See also
 Mammary Lane
 The History of Howard Stern
Master Tape Theatre

External links
Howard 100 Channel Guide
Sirius Howard 100
Howard Stern’s Official Website
Avid Power Handheld Spotlight
Stern Fan Network
Sirius Backstage's Howard Stern Forum

Sirius Satellite Radio
2007 radio programme debuts
Howard Stern